= Kesarakoni =

Village in Karnataka, India

Coordinates: 15°43′13″N 76°56′24″E

Kesarakoni is a village in the southern state of Karnataka, India.

== See also ==
- Bellary
- Districts of Karnataka
